Exilisia quadripunctata is a moth of the subfamily Arctiinae. It was described by Hervé de Toulgoët in 1956. It is found in the Comoro Islands.

References

 

Lithosiini
Moths described in 1956